Thalassiosirales is an order of centric diatoms. The order currently contains 471 species. Species in the order Thalassiosirales are common in brackish, nearshore, and open-ocean habitats, with approximately the same number of freshwater and marine species.

The Thalassiosirales species Thalassiosira pseudonana was chosen as the first eukaryotic marine phytoplankton for whole genome sequencing. T. pseudonana was selected for this study because it is a model for diatom physiology studies, belongs to a genus widely distributed throughout the world's oceans, and has a relatively small genome at 34 mega base pairs. Scientists are researching on diatom light absorption, using the marine diatom Thalassiosira.

References 

 

Diatom orders